Oakwood may refer to:

Places
in Australia
Oakwood, Queensland, a locality in the Bundaberg Region

in Canada
Oakwood, Ontario
Oakwood-Vaughan, Toronto, Ontario, a neighbourhood
Oakwood Collegiate Institute, a public high school in the southern end of the Oakwood-Vaughan neighbourhood

in the United Kingdom
Oakwood, Derbyshire, a housing estate in Derby, England
Oakwood, Leeds, area of the city
Oakwood, London, part of Enfield
Oakwood tube station
Oakwood, Warrington, a neighbourhood in Birchwood, Warrington, Cheshire
Oakwood Park, Essex
Oakwood Theme Park in Pembrokeshire, Wales
Oakwood (HM Prison), a prison near Wolverhampton

in the United States (by state)
Oakwood University, located in Huntsville, Alabama
Oakwood, a neighborhood in Venice, Los Angeles
Oakwood, Georgia
Oakwood, Illinois
Oakwood, LaPorte County, Indiana
Oakwood, Steuben County, Indiana
Oakwood Estate, a historic house in Winchester, Kentucky also known as Oakwood, listed on the National Register of Historic Places (NRHP)
Oakwood, Maryland
Oakwood (Harwood, Maryland), NRHP-listed in Anne Arundel County
Oakwood, Missouri
Oakwood, Hannibal, Missouri
Oakwood, Staten Island, New York, a neighborhood in New York City
Historic Oakwood, North Carolina, a neighborhood in Raleigh
Oakwood, Cuyahoga County, Ohio
Oakwood, Montgomery County, Ohio
Oakwood, Paulding County, Ohio
Oakwood, Oklahoma
Oakwood, an incorporated area in Lawrence County, Pennsylvania
Oakwood, a neighborhood in Pittsburgh, Pennsylvania
Oakwood, Texas
Oakwood, Milwaukee County, Wisconsin
Oakwood, Winnebago County, Wisconsin

See also
Oakwood Academy (disambiguation)
Oakwood Cemetery (disambiguation)
Oakwood School (disambiguation)
Oakwood (single), a song by The Redding Brothers
Oakwood mutiny, an attempted coup in the Philippines in 2003
"The Abbey in the Oakwood", painting by Caspar David Friedrich